German air passenger taxes are excise duties and other charges levied by the German government on most passengers departing by air, either in addition to the price of the airline ticket or incorporated into the ticket price.

Ecological departure tax
A departure tax is to apply for all departures starting from 1 January 2011. The amount depends on the destination country; the following table shows the minimum payable (agents may charge tax handling costs).

See also
 Air Passenger Duty for the United Kingdom departure duty
 Carbon tax on airline tickets

References

Taxation in Germany
Aviation in Germany
Aviation taxes
Transport law